is a Japanese manga series written by Noboru Takahashi. It was serialized in Shogakukan's Weekly Young Sunday from 2005 to 2008, and transferred to Big Comic Spirits in 2008. It has been adapted into a live-action film, titled The Mole Song: Undercover Agent Reiji in 2013, which was followed by a sequel, The Mole Song: Hong Kong Capriccio, released in 2016.

As of March 2022, the manga had over 9.6 million copies in circulation. In 2014, Mogura no Uta won the 59th Shogakukan Manga Award in the General category.

Plot
Reiji Kikukawa, a silly young man still a virgin, managed to join the police. Remaining in a position of simple agent at the bottom of the ladder, Reiji is one day fired. In reality, this dismissal hides a completely different mission, because Reiji is offered to become an undercover agent, in other words, a "mole".

Media

Manga
Mogura no Uta is written and illustrated by Noboru Takahashi. The series ran in Shogakukan's Weekly Young Sunday from 2005 to 2008, when the magazine ceased its publication. It was then transferred to Big Comic Spirits in 2008. Shogakukan has collected its chapters into individual tankōbon volumes. The first volume was released on January 5, 2006. As of November 30, 2022, seventy-eight volumes have been released.

Live-action films
The manga was adapted into a live action film titled The Mole Song: Undercover Agent Reiji and directed by Takashi Miike that was released in Japan on February 15, 2014. Miike also directed a sequel, The Mole Song: Hong Kong Capriccio, which was released in 2016.

Reception
Mogura no Uta won the 59th Shogakukan Manga Award in the General category in 2014. The manga has 6.5 million copies in print as of January 2016. As of March 2022, the cumulative number of copies has exceeded to 9.6 million copies.

References

External links

Action anime and manga
Crime in anime and manga
Manga adapted into films
Shogakukan manga
Seinen manga
Winners of the Shogakukan Manga Award for general manga